Poland competed at the 1952 Summer Olympics in Helsinki, Finland. 125 competitors, 103 men and 22 women, took part in 74 events in 11 sports. Zygmunt Chychła became first post-War Olympic gold champion.

Medalists

Athletics

Men
Track & road events

Field events

Women
Track & road events

Field events

Boxing

Men

Fencing

13 fencers, 10 male and 3 female, represented Poland in 1952.

Men

Women

Football

Preliminary round results

First round results

Gymnastics

Artistic
Men

Women

Hockey

First round results

Rowing

Men

Shooting

Two shooters represented Poland in 1952.

Men

Swimming

Men

Women

Weightlifting

Men

Wrestling

Men's Greco-Roman

References

External links
Official Olympic Reports
International Olympic Committee results database

Nations at the 1952 Summer Olympics
1952
1952 in Polish sport